Barry Robinson may refer to:

 Barry Robinson (cricketer) (born 1932), English cricketer
 Barry Robinson (athlete) (born 1937), New Zealand athlete and architect
 Barry Robinson (American Dad!), a character in American Dad!